Joan Amades i Gelats (Barcelona, 23 July 1890 - 17 January 1959), was a Catalan ethnologist and folklorist. An autodidact, he worked at the historical archive of the city of Barcelona and at the Museum of Industry and Popular Arts of the same city. From 1956 onwards, he collaborated with UNESCO. He was also an important promoter of Esperanto and founded the  Federació Esperantista Catalana (Catalan Esperanto association). Perhaps the most important book in his large bibliography is Costumari Català (a collection of Catalan customs), the main work for the study of Catalan popular culture.

Most important works 
 Les diades populars catalanes (1932–1949) (the Catalan popular feasts)
 Les cent millor cançons populars (1949) (the 100 best folk songs)
 Refranyer català comentat (1951) (commented collection of Catalan sayings)
 Les cent millors rondalles populars (1953) (the 100 best popular fairy tales)
 Costumari Català (1950–1956) (collection of Catalan customs)
 Guia de les festes tradicionals de Catalunya. Itinerari per tot l´any (1958) (guide to traditional feasts in Catalonia. Itinerary for the whole year)

Bibliography 
 Antoni Anguela, Lluís Calvo [et al.], El món de Joan Amades, Barcelona, Departament de Cultura de la Generalitat de Catalunya, 1990. (Joan Amades’ World, in Catalan)

External links 

 Històries i Llegendes de Barcelona selecció a Eixample Web  (Stories and Legends of Barcelona, in Catalan)
 Associació Cultural Joan Amades (Cultural association Joan Amades, in Catalan)

Burials at Montjuïc Cemetery
Writers from Catalonia
Catalan-language writers
Ethnologists from Catalonia
1890 births
1959 deaths
Writers from Barcelona